The House d'Udekem is the name of a noble family that belongs to the nobility of Belgium since 1816.

History 
The origin of the Udekem family dates back to the Late Middle Ages, with the earliest member recorded as dying in 1472. In the 18th century the Dominium of Acoz was obtained via marriage by the family.

Until 2000, the head of the d'Udekem family held the rank of Baron. After the wedding of Mathilde d'Udekem d'Acoz with the Duke of Brabant, King Albert II extended the hereditary title of Count to the three brothers Henri, Raoul and Patrick d'Udekem d'Acoz and to all their descendants.

Members of the family were active in politics.

Descendants of Charles Joseph, Baron d'Udekem d'Acoz 

Charles Joseph Marie Ghislain, Baron (1921) d'Udekem d'Acoz (1885-1968), lord Mayor of Proven
 Henri Joseph Adelin François Xavier Marie, Count (2000) d'Udekem d'Acoz (1933-2021), lord Mayor of Poperinge, married to Jonkvrouw Marie-Madeleine Kervyn d'Oud Mooreghem (born 1940), without issue
 Raoul Paul Adelin François Xavier Marie, Count (2000) d´Udekem d'Acoz (born 1935), local politician, married in 1960 to Jonkvrouw Françoise de Maere d'Aertrycke (born 1935)
Bernard Marguerite Jean Charles Marie Ghislain, Count (2000) d'Udekem d'Acoz (born 1965) married in 1998 to Jonkvrouw Marie-Pierre Verhaegen (born 1966), historian, and has three children
Patrick Paul François Xavier Marie Ghislain, Count (2000) d'Udekem d'Acoz (1936-2008), local politician, married in 1971 to Countess Anna Maria Komorowska (born 1946)
Mathilde, Countess (2000) d'Udekem d'Acoz (born 1973), married in 1999 to King Philippe of Belgium (born 1960)
 Jonkvrouw Marie-Alix (1974-1997)
 Elisabeth, Countess (2000) d'Udekem d'Acoz (born 1977), married to Margrave Alfonso Pallavicini (born 1964)
 Hélène, Countess (2000) d'Udekem d'Acoz (born 1979), married to Baron Nicolas Janssen (born 1974)
 Charles-Henri, Count (2000) d'Udekem d'Acoz (born 1985), married in 2022 to Caroline Philippe

Properties of d'Udekem d'Acoz family

References

Belgian noble families
Roman Catholic families